Fort Point Light was a lighthouse located on the south side of the entrance to Galveston Bay in Texas.

History
This light was not long-lived. Although the land was reserved for the Republic of Texas as far back as 1836, Congress did not appropriate construction funds until 1878, and the light was not completed until 1882. Eleven years later, the light was discontinued, but the station continued to serve as a fog signal until 1950, with the light being dismantled three years later. A modern beacon stands near the site as a range light for one of the large ship channel segments.

References

Lighthouses completed in 1882
Buildings and structures in Galveston, Texas
Lighthouses in Texas
History of Galveston, Texas
Buildings and structures demolished in 1953
1882 establishments in Texas
1953 disestablishments in Texas